Zachary Portillos (born 19 January 1992) is an American professional soccer player who plays as a defender.

Career

College and Youth
Portillos was born in Aurora, Colorado, where he enjoyed a highly-decorated high school career with Grandview High School. Portillos earned All-Conference, All-Region, and All-American honors his sophomore year; he was a first-team All-State selection his sophomore, junior, and senior seasons; he was named team captain during his junior and senior years, and was the 2008 Colorado State Player of the Year. While in Aurora, Portillos played his club ball in the Real Colorado system.

After high school, Portillos started school at the University of Washington, where he was named team Rookie of the Year for 2010. Portillos transferred to powerhouse University of Akron for his sophomore season and became a mainstay for the Zips for three years. While in Akron, Portillos worked alongside current Rowdies goalkeepers coach Stuart Dobson.

Tampa Bay Rowdies
On 23 February 2015 it was announced that Portillos had signed his first professional contract with the Tampa Bay Rowdies of the North American Soccer League. Portillos first arrived in Tampa Bay for the Rowdies' Jan. 30-Feb. 1 invite-only combine, where he impressed Thomas Rongen's coaching staff and joined the team as a trialist. Portillos' first start with the Rowdies came against Swedish Allsvenskan champions Malmö FF, and his first goal was the only one in a 1-0 victory over Portuguese side C.D. Fátima during a preseason tour of Portugal.

Portillos' preseason performance persuaded Head Coach Thomas Rongen to include him in the starting eleven for the Rowdies regular season opener against the defending Soccer Bowl champion San Antonio Scorpions. Portillos played all 90 minutes as part of a staunch Rowdies backline that stifled the Scorpions attack en route to a 3-1 win.

On April 15, Portillos suffered a season-ending injury during training, rupturing his right Achilles tendon. Portillos signed a contract extension with the Rowdies to keep him on the team for the 2016 season on December 22, 2015.

References

External links 
 Tampa Bay Rowdies Profile.

1992 births
Living people
American soccer players
Washington Huskies men's soccer players
Akron Zips men's soccer players
Des Moines Menace players
Tampa Bay Rowdies players
Association football defenders
Soccer players from Colorado
USL League Two players
North American Soccer League players